Jerome H. Kern (born June 1, 1937) is an American lawyer, investment banker, consultant, and philanthropist. Kern was one of the founding members of Wachtell, Lipton, Rosen & Katz. After a career in investment banking, he served as a senior partner of Shea & Gould, then at Baker Botts, while holding senior leadership positions at Tele-Communications Inc. In the early 2000s, he was CEO of Linkshare, On Command, and Playboy. He was also chairman and CEO of Colorado Symphony and is currently a senior advisor to Moelis & Company.

Biography 
Kern received his B.A. from Columbia University in 1957. He then graduated from New York University School of Law on a Root-Tilden Scholarship in 1960 and was managing editor of the New York University Law Review.

In 1965, Kern, Herbert Wachtell, Martin Lipton, Leonard Rosen, and George Katz, formed the law firm Wachtell, Lipton, Rosen & Katz. Kern later left the firm to pursue a career in investment banking, running his own brokerage firm J.H. Kern & Company. He returned to law practice, was a partner at Olwine, Connelly, Chase, O’Donnell & Weyher, and eventually becoming an executive committee member of Shea & Gould.

From 1992 to 1998, Kern was a partner at Baker Botts and was the top outside legal counsel to Tele-Communications Inc. and Liberty Media for over twenty years. Described as the right-hand man to John C. Malone, Kern was the architect of TCI's merger with AT&T Corporation and served as a director and Vice Chairman of TCI. Malone once referred to Kern as "the dean of cable lawyers." He left the board of Liberty Media in 2004.

Kern was made CEO of Linkshare in 1999. He then served as Chairman and CEO of On Command, the nation's largest provider of pay-per-view video services in hotel rooms from 2000 to 2001.

Since 2001, Kern has run his own consulting firm, Kern Consulting LLC, focusing on serving clients in the media and telecommunications sectors. He joined the board of Playboy Enterprises in 2002 and served as interim CEO from 2008 to 2009 following the departure of Christie Hefner. Kern departed Playboy's board of directors in 2009. In 2007, he also formed Enki Strategic Advisors, a consulting firm helping companies expand into mobile and multi-platform media technologies.

In 2020, Kern joined Moelis & Company as senior advisor.

Philanthropy 
Kern donated $5 million to New York University School of Law and set off a $30 million fundraising campaign for the Root-Tilden Scholarship program. Then NYU Law dean John Sexton renamed the scholarship program Root-Tilden-Kern Scholarship in honor of his generosity. He currently sits on the law school's board of trustees.

Kern served as Chairman and CEO of Colorado Symphony from 2016 to 2021 and helped with the symphony's fundraising efforts. Kern took over the symphony in 2011 when it was on the verge of bankruptcy, with $1.2 million in debt, and left the organization with an $88 million endowment at the time of his retirement. As Chairman, he hired Andrew Litton as music director of the symphony.

Personal life 
Kern is married to Dr. Mary Rossick Kern. The couple lived at the Four Seasons Hotel Denver.

References 

1937 births
Columbia College (New York) alumni
New York University School of Law alumni
Playboy people
Liberty Media people
Wachtell, Lipton, Rosen & Katz people
20th-century American lawyers
American businesspeople in mass media
American chief executives
Philanthropists from Colorado
American entertainment industry businesspeople
American consulting businesspeople
American consultants
Businesspeople from Colorado
Living people